FIOE may refer to:

 Federation of Islamic Organizations in Europe
 First Impressions of Earth, the third album by American garage rock band, The Strokes